Herve Tonye-Tonye (born May 15, 1988) is a professional Canadian football linebacker who is currently a free agent. He was drafted 24th overall by the Argonauts in the 2012 CFL Draft, but played out his final year of college eligibility before signing with the team on May 24, 2013. He played college football for the Alcorn State Braves and the Northern Colorado Bears.

References

External links
Toronto Argonauts bio 

1988 births
Living people
Canadian football linebackers
Toronto Argonauts players
Canadian football people from Montreal
Sportspeople from Yaoundé
Players of Canadian football from Quebec
Northern Colorado Bears football players
Alcorn State Braves football players
Cameroonian players of American football
Ottawa Redblacks players